Branchiostegus saitoi, is a species of marine ray-finned fish, a tilefish belonging to the family Malacanthidae. It is found in the Philippines.

References

Malacanthidae
Taxa named by James Keith Dooley
Taxa named by Yukio Iwatsuki
Fish described in 2012